Animal Ethics is a nonprofit organization formed to promote discussion and debate around issues in animal ethics and to provide information and resources for animal advocates. They also do outreach work in several countries on the issue of speciesism. Their aim is to create a world where moral consideration is extended to all sentient beings. The organization's website covers topics such as speciesism, sentience, veganism and wild animal suffering and has content translated into several languages.

History 
Animal Ethics was co-founded by Daniel Dorado, Oscar Horta and Leah Mckelvie in 2012. A stated aim for establishing the organization by Horta was the promotion of welfare biology as a field of research.

Animal Charity Evaluators recommended Animal Ethics as one of its standout charities from December 2015 to November 2017.

Work 
In 2015 and 2017, Animal Ethics awarded an essay prize for essays on the topic of animal suffering in the wild.

In 2018, the organization started to work in Chinese.

In 2020, Animal Ethics released an online course on wild animal suffering. In the same year, they extended their outreach work to India and started a website in Hindi.

As of April 2022, Animal Ethics participated in the World Day for the End of Speciesism in 2020 and 2021 by broadcasting series of online talks about speciesism in English, Portuguese and Spanish.

See also 
 List of animal rights groups
 Oxford Centre for Animal Ethics
 UPF-Centre for Animal Ethics
 Wild Animal Initiative

References

External links 
 
 Animal Charity Evaluators' Review
 

2012 establishments in California
501(c)(3) organizations
Animal ethics organizations
Animal rights organizations
Animal welfare organizations based in the United States
Non-profit organizations based in the San Francisco Bay Area
Organizations established in 2012
Organizations associated with effective altruism
Organizations based in Oakland, California
Wild animal suffering